Dětřichov is a municipality and village in Svitavy District in the Pardubice Region of the Czech Republic. It has about 400 inhabitants.

Etymology
The original Latin name of the village Theodriciuilla is derived from the personal name Theodericus (German: Dietrich, Czech: Dětřich), meaning "Theodor's village". The Czech and German names were created by translation. The German name later appeared as Dittersdorf.

Geography
It lies in the Svitavy Uplands.

History
The first written mention of Dětřichov is from 1167. In 1278, the area was colonized by German settlers. The hamlet of Vysoké Pole, nowadays a local part of Dětřichov, was founded in 1777. After the World War II, the German population was expelled and partially replaced by Czechs.

Demographics

Sights
The landmark of Dětřichov is the Church of Saints Peter and Paul. Its existence was first documented in 1350. In 1793, it was rebuilt into its current Baroque form.

References

External links

Cities and towns in the Czech Republic
Populated places in Svitavy District